Analisa (non-standard Indonesian for Analysis) is a broadsheet newspaper published daily in Medan, the capital of the North Sumatra province in Indonesia.  Published since 23 March 1972, Analisa is one of the largest newspaper in Medan. It was initially published once a week before becoming a daily newspaper.

References

External links
 

Newspapers published in Medan
Indonesian-language newspapers
Newspapers established in 1972
1972 establishments in Indonesia